The 2011 Campeonato Brasileiro Série A (officially the Brasileirão Petrobras 2011 for sponsorship reasons) was the 55th edition of the Campeonato Brasileiro Série A, the top-level of professional football in Brazil. It began on May 21 and was scheduled to end on December 4. Fluminense comes in as the defending champion having won the 2010 season.

Format
For the ninth consecutive season, the tournament will be played in a double round-robin system. The team with most points will be declared the champion. The bottom-four teams will be relegated for the following season.

International qualification
The Série A will serve as a qualifier to CONMEBOL's 2012 international tournaments. The top-two teams in the standings will qualify to the Second Stage of the 2012 Copa Libertadores, while the next third and fourth place in the standings will qualify to the First Stage. The next eight best teams in the standings will earn berths to the Second Stage of the 2012 Copa Sudamericana.

Team information
Vitória, Guarani, Goiás and Grêmio Prudente were relegated to the 2011 Campeonato Brasileiro Série B after finishing in the bottom four spots of the table at the end of the 2010 season. Goiás were relegated to the Série B after eleven seasons of continuous membership in the top football league of Brazil, while Vitória ended a three-year tenure in Série A and Grêmio Prudente ended a two-year appearance. Guarani made their immediate return to the second level.

The four relegated teams were replaced by four 2010 Série B sides. Champions Coritiba, made their immediate return to Série A, runners-up Figueirense, who returned after two years, third placed Bahia, who returned to the top flight after seven seasons at lower levels, and fourth placed América Mineiro, who returned to the league for the first time in eight years.

Personnel and kits

Note: Flags indicate national team as has been defined under FIFA eligibility rules. Players may hold more than one non-FIFA nationality.

 1 According to current revision League managers

Managerial changes

League table

Results

Top goalscorers

References

External links
Official webpage 
Official regulations 
2011 Campeonato Brasileiro Série A at Soccerway

Campeonato Brasileiro Série A seasons
1